Wendell Hinkle Furry (February 18, 1907 – December 17, 1984) was a professor of physics at Harvard University who made  contributions to theoretical and particle physics. The Furry theorem is named after him.

Early life
Furry was born in Prairieton, Indiana on February 18. 1907. He earned an A.B. degree from DePauw University in 1928 and an A.M. and Ph.D. from the University of Illinois in 1930 and 1932, respectively.

Career
Furry made contributions to the early development of Quantum Field Theory with J. Robert Oppenheimer, Vladimir Fock, and others. During World War II, he worked on radar at MIT's Radiation Laboratory. He was a Guggenheim Fellow in 1949.

After the war, Furry continued teaching at Harvard, later becoming a full professor and serving for three years as chairman of the Physics Department from 1965 to 1968. After several years of half-time partial retirement, he accepted full retirement in 1977.

McCarthyism
In 1953, Furry was subpoenaed several times as a suspected communist by the House Unamerican Activities Committee and by US Senator Joseph R. McCarthy, and invoked his Fifth Amendment privilege in refusing to answer questions about his past membership in the Communist Party. In early 1954, he dropped the Fifth Amendment defense in a nationally televised hearing before Senator McCarthy and answered questions about himself but refused to name others. Because of that refusal, he was indicted for contempt of Congress but the case was dropped several years later.

Furry was defended by newly appointed Harvard president Nathan M. Pusey, who refused McCarthy's demands to fire him, and also by Nobel laureate in physics and fellow Harvard professor Edward M. Purcell. He co-authored a general physics text of the time with Purcell and J. C. Street.

He, like so many other intellectuals of the depression era, had great interest in the then on-going Russian experiment in attempting to create a "communist" society. As part of that interest he taught himself Russian and for many years supplemented his income by translating and editing Russian physics journals published by the American Institute of Physics. He later played a significant role in the writing of Irving Emin's Russian—English Physics Dictionary (New York: John Wiley & Sons, 1963), a work that is still widely used today. Furry's contribution is acknowledged in the preface on p. vii. A soft-spoken man, but an excellent, well-organized teacher, he is remembered by his former students for his many kindnesses. As part of his wartime work at the MIT Radiation Laboratory he did significant, still useful work on radar propagation that is documented in Chapter 2 (pp. 27–180) in Vol. 13, Propagation of Short Radio Waves, edited by Donald E. Kerr, as a part of the Massachusetts Institute of Technology Radiation Laboratory Series, McGraw-Hill Book Company, 1951.

Death
Furry died in Cambridge, Massachusetts on December 17, 1984.

Works

 Physics for science and engineering students (1952)

See also
Antiparticle
Double beta decay
Neutrinoless double beta decay

References

External links 

 Oral history interview transcript with Wendell Furry on 9 August 1971, American Institute of Physics, Niels Bohr Library & Archives

1907 births
1984 deaths
People from Vigo County, Indiana
20th-century American physicists
Harvard University faculty
DePauw University alumni
University of Illinois Urbana-Champaign alumni
Fellows of the American Physical Society